Harry Charles Giles (also known as Harry Gyles, 10 August 1911 – 4 August 1986) was an Australian rules footballer who played with Essendon in the Victorian Football League (VFL).

Notes

External links 

1911 births
1986 deaths
Australian rules footballers from Victoria (Australia)
Essendon Football Club players